Luokė (Samogitian: Loukė) is a town in Telšiai County, Lithuania. According to the 2011 census, the town has a population of 629 people. The Church of All Saints is located in the town.

References

Towns in Lithuania
Towns in Telšiai County
Telšiai District Municipality
Shavelsky Uyezd